Jason Drysdale (born 17 November 1970 in Bristol) is an English former footballer.

Drysale began his career with Watford where he made over 100 appearances in a six-year period before joining Newcastle United. He then signed for Swindon Town before a short spell with Northampton Town.

Drysdale then moved into non-league football and signed for Forest Green Rovers. He was a part of the Forest Green side which reached the 2001 FA Trophy final but lost 1–0 to Canvey Island at Villa Park. He played for three years with Forest Green before following departed manager, Frank Gregan, by signing for Welsh Premier League side Aberystwyth Town.

Drysale returned to England shortly after and signed for Bath City before ending his career with Mangotsfield United and Paulton Rovers.

References

External links

1970 births
Living people
English footballers
Association football fullbacks
Watford F.C. players
Newcastle United F.C. players
Swindon Town F.C. players
Northampton Town F.C. players
Forest Green Rovers F.C. players
Footballers from Bristol